Paul Koch (22 May 1897 – 22 October 1959) was a German racing cyclist. He won the German National Road Race in 1920.

References

External links
 

1897 births
1959 deaths
People from Nordwestmecklenburg
People from the Grand Duchy of Mecklenburg-Schwerin
German male cyclists
Cyclists from Mecklenburg-Western Pomerania
German cycling road race champions
20th-century German people